Time Remembered: John McLaughlin Plays Bill Evans is an album by John McLaughlin. It was recorded in March 1993 and released on the Verve label in 1993. The album reached number 10 in the Billboard Top Jazz Albums chart.

Reception
Allmusic awarded the album with 2 stars and the review by Scott Yanow states: "...more mood and tempo variations would have kept this from being such a sleepy and overly respectful session." Whereas Walter Kolosky in his All About Jazz review is far more positive stating: "Time Remembered is a beautiful and fully realized tribute. The sound is full and rich, and the playing is strong and forthright all around. McLaughlin’s soloing is fluid, occasionally too dense, but never misdirected."

Track listing
All tracks composed by Bill Evans; except where indicated
 "Prologue" – 2:14 	
 "Very Early (Homage to Bill Evans)" (Bill Evans, John McLaughlin) – 4:20
 "Only Child" – 5:06
 "Waltz for Debby" (Bill Evans, Gene Lees) – 4:55
 "Homage" (John McLaughlin) – 2:16
 "My Bells" – 3:22
 "Time Remembered" – 3:59
 "Song for Helen" – 1:54
 "Turn Out the Stars" – 6:26
 "We Will Meet Again" – 4:20
 "Epilogue" – 1:14

Personnel
 Alexandre Delfa – acoustic guitar
 Yan Maresz – acoustic bass
 John McLaughlin – acoustic guitar
 Pascal Rabatti – acoustic guitar
 François Szonyi – acoustic guitar

Other credits
 Jean-Philippe Allard – executive producer
 Paolo Bocchi – assistant engineer
 Dario Bontempi – engineer
 Max Costa – engineer
 Charles French – photography
 Jean-Pierre Larcher – photography
 John McLaughlin – liner notes, mixing supervision, producer

Charts

References

1993 albums
John McLaughlin (musician) albums
Bill Evans tribute albums
Verve Records albums